Luther is a given name of various origins, The name Luther is boy's name of German origin meaning army. Once restricted to Evangelical Protestants honoring the ecclesiastical reformer and theologian Martin Luther, founder the Protestant Church.
Notable people with the giving name Luther include:

First Name
 Luther Allison (1939–1997), American blues guitarist
 Luther Badger (1785–1868), American congressman from New York
 Luther Loren Baxter (1832-1915), American politician, lawyer, and judge
 Luther Burbank (1849–1926), American botanist
 Luther Hare (1851–1929), was an officer in the 7th U.S. Cavalry, best known for participating in the Battle of the Little Big Horn.
 Luther Halsey Gulick (1892–1993), was an American political scientist, Eaton Professor of Municipal Science and Administration at Columbia University, and Director of its Institute of Public Administration, known as an expert on public administration.
 Luther Campbell (born 1960), American rap performer and record executive
 Luther Dickinson (born 1973), American rock guitarist
 Luther Goldman (1909–2005), American naturalist and wildlife photographer
 Luther Grosvenor (born 1946), English rock musician
 Luther Head (born 1982), NBA basketball player
 Luther Ingram (1937–2007), American R&B singer-songwriter
 Luther M. Jarrett (1804–1854), American politician
 Luther Lassiter (1918–1988), Professional American Pool player
 Luther Magby (18961966), American gospel singer
 Luther Martin (1748–1826), American lawyer and political leader
 Luther Robinson (born 1991), American football player
 Luther B. Scherer (1879-1957), also known as Tutor Scherer, American casino investor in Las Vegas, Nevada.
  (1950–2017), her was a member People's Representative Council of the Republic of Indonesia from the Gerindra Party faction for period 2014–2017 and he has served as a member of Regional Representative Council of the Republic of Indonesia from East Kalimantan for 2 periods namely 2004–2009 and 2009–2014.
 Luther Strange (born 1953), American senator from Alabama
 Luther Blissett (born 1958), English footballer
 Luther Vandross (1951–2005), American R&B singer
 Luther Warder (1841–1902), Mayor of Jeffersonville, Indiana
 Luther Wright (born 1971), NBA basketball player
 Luther Singh (born 1997), he is a South African professional soccer player who plays as a winger for Primeira Liga club G.D. Chaves, on loan from Danish club F.C. Copenhagen, and the South Africa national soccer team.

Middle Name
 Colin Luther Powell (1937–2021), American politician, diplomat, and retired four-star general
 John Luther Adams (born 1953), American composer
 Martin Luther King Jr. (1929–1968), a key leader of the American civil rights movement in the 1960s
 Martin Luther King Sr. (1899–1984), father of Martin Luther King Jr.
 Martin Luther King III (born 1957), human rights advocate and son of Martin Luther King Jr.
 William Luther Pierce (1933–2002), American neo-nazi author

Nickname

 Luther Blissett (pseudonym), nom de plume for several artists and writers
 Dr. Luther, stage name of Canadian professional wrestler Len Olson
 Luther Reigns (born 1971), stage name of American professional wrestler Matthew Weise

Fiction

 Luther, Barack Obama's "anger translator" in Key & Peele
 Luther Stickell, supporting character in the Mission: Impossible series
 Luther Strode, protagonist of the comic book The Strange Talent of Luther Strode
 Luther Whitney, protagonist of the movie Absolute Power
Luther McDonald, side character of the tv series It’s Always Sunny in Philadelphia
 Luther Hargreeves, main character in The Umbrella Academy (TV series)

See Also
 Luther (surname)
 Luther (disambiguation)

English masculine given names
German masculine given names